NVCC is an initialism that may refer to:
Northern Virginia Community College, a network of community colleges throughout Northern Virginia
Naugatuck Valley Community College, a community college in Waterbury, Connecticut
NVIDIA CUDA Compiler, a compiler for parallel CUDA codes